Final league standings for the 1932–33 St. Louis Soccer League.

League standings

Top Goal Scorers

External links
St. Louis Soccer Leagues (RSSSF)
The Year in American Soccer - 1932

1931-32
1931–32 domestic association football leagues
1931–32 in American soccer
St Louis
St Louis